Professor Ki Padosan is a 1993 Indian film directed by Shantilal Soni, starring Sanjeev Kumar, Asha Parekh, Padmini Kolhapure, Shekhar Suman, Aruna Irani and Dalip Tahil. It marked Sanjeev Kumar's last film appearance, released 8 years after his death in 1985. The film pays tribute to Sanjeev Kumar with Amitabh Bachchan serving as the narrator of the film and shown paying tribute to Kumar in the end credits.

Cast
Sanjeev Kumar as Professor Vidyadhar
Asha Parekh as Shobha
Padmini Kolhapure as Menka
Shekhar Suman as Vinod
Deven Verma as Pyarelal
Aruna Irani as Mandha
Dalip Tahil as Ranjeet
Anant Mahadevan as Vaidyaji
Abhi Bhattacharya as Dr. Dharamdas (Scientist)
Amitabh Bachchan as Narrator
Muhamad Hamza Abbasi

Production
The film started production in the 1980s, but was left incomplete with its leading actor Sanjeev Kumar's death in November 1985. At the time of his death, the film was only 75% complete and the script was subsequently changed to make him invisible in the remaining portions of the film and complete it for release in 1993. Sudesh Bhosle did the dubbing for Sanjeev Kumar in the film.

Music
"Aisi Jaldi Bhi Kya Hai Sanam" - Alka Yagnik, Kavita Krishnamurthy
"Mai Hu Tu Hai Aur Tanhayi" - Sudesh Bhosle, Kavita Krishnamurthy
"Mile Jhumke Milan Rut Aayi" - Anup Jalota, Lata Mangeshkar
"Modern Girl Pehn Ke Chote Diamond" - Alka Yagnik, Padmini, Sudesh Bhosle

References

External links
 

Films scored by R. D. Burman
1990s Hindi-language films
1993 films